Farrand-Pierson House is a historic home located at Newark Valley in Tioga County, New York. The house is a "T" shaped structure.  The main section of the house was built about 1860 in the Greek Revival style, while the rear wing appears to incorporate an earlier house dating to about 1830. Also on the property are a small barn, hog house, and chicken house.

It was listed on the National Register of Historic Places in 1997.

References

Houses on the National Register of Historic Places in New York (state)
Greek Revival houses in New York (state)
Houses completed in 1860
Houses in Tioga County, New York
National Register of Historic Places in Tioga County, New York